Portrait of Yevgeny Mravinsky is a painting by Russian portrait artist Lev Russov (1926–1987), whose work depicts the famous Russian and Soviet musician Yevgeny Aleksandrovich Mravinsky (1903—1988), principal conductor of the Leningrad Philharmonic Orchestra in 1938–1988 years.

History 

The portrait was painted in Leningrad in 1957. Evgeny Mravinsky is shown at home, sitting in an armchair in a quiet position, immersed in thought. His appearance, details of clothing and interior design and hand positions convey him at the time of creation. The instruments of his profession are pushed into the background. Before us is primarily a contemporary, intellectual man of an independent character, will and developed self-esteem. It is these qualities that Mravinsky wanted to convey onto Russov in this work. This helped not only his profession, but also the long-term friendship linking the two artists. In 1957, the portrait was exhibited for the first time at the Leningrad artists show in the Russian State Museum.

In 2007 the Portrait of Yevgeny Mravinsky had been commented on and reproduced in the book Unknown Socialist Realism. The Leningrad School among 350 selected works by artists of the Leningrad School.

See also 

 Portrait of Catherine Balebina

References

Bibliography 
 1917 - 1957. Exhibition of works by Leningrad artists. Catalogue. - Leningrad: Khudozhnik RSFSR, 1958. - P. 28.
 Directory of Members of the Union of Artists of USSR. Volume 2.- Moscow: Soviet artist, 1979. - P. 290.
 Directory of members of the Leningrad branch of Union of Artists of Russian Federation. - Leningrad: Khudozhnik RSFSR, 1980. - p. 103.
 Gregor Tassie. Yevgeny Mravinsky: The Noble Conductor. The Scarecrow Press, 2005. 
 Иванов С. О ранних портретах Льва Русова // Петербургские искусствоведческие тетради. Выпуск 23. СПб., 2012. С.7-15.

External links 
 Sergei V. Ivanov. Mysteries of early portraits of Lev Russov. (Rus)

1957 paintings
20th-century portraits
Paintings by Lev Russov
Portraits by Russian artists